Yuruaní-tepui, also known by the Pemón name Iwalkarima, Iwalecalima or Iwarkárima, is a tepui of the Eastern Tepuis chain primarily situated in Venezuela, while part of the eastern ridge stretches into the disputed Guayana Esequiba territory in Guyana. It lies just east of the much smaller Wadakapiapué-tepui. This Tepui is not located in the Canaima National Park unlike most other Tepuis in the area.

See also
 Distribution of Heliamphora

References

Further reading

 Jaffe, K., J. Lattke & R. Perez-Hernández (January–June 1993). Ants on the tepuies of the Guiana Shield: a zoogeographic study. Ecotropicos 6(1): 21–28.
 Kok, P.J.R., R.D. MacCulloch, D.B. Means, K. Roelants, I. Van Bocxlaer & F. Bossuyt (7 August 2012).  Current Biology 22(15): R589–R590.  [
 Rodder, D. & K.-H. Jungfer (2 July 2008). A new Pristimantis (Anura, Strabomantidae) from Yuruani-tepui, Venezuela. Zootaxa 1814: 58–68. []

Tepuis of Venezuela
Tepuis of Guyana
Mountains of Venezuela
International mountains of South America
Guyana–Venezuela border
Mountains of Bolívar (state)